The Read family of Delaware were a prominent political family in the 18th and 19th centuries in Delaware, New Jersey and Pennsylvania. It was founded by John Read, a wealthy Englishman who was one of the founders of Chestertown, Maryland.

Family Members
John Read (1688- June 17, 1756), m. Mary Howell, resided New Castle County, Delaware
George Read (Sep 18, 1733- Sep 21, 1798), m. Gertrude Ross Till, resided New Castle, Delaware. Signer of the Declaration of Independence, U.S. Senator, and Acting President of Delaware.
John, died in infancy
George, II, resided New Castle, Delaware
John (Jul 7, 1769 - July 13, 1854), banker, resided Philadelphia, Pennsylvania
John Merideth Read (Jul 21, 1797 - Nov 29, 1874), Chief Justice of Pennsylvania, resided Philadelphia, Pennsylvania
John Merideth Read (Feb 21, 1837- ) diplomatist
Thomas Read (1740- Oct 26, 1788), Commodore, U.S. Navy, resided Bordentown, New Jersey
James Read (1743- Dec 31, 1822), Colonel, Continental Army, resided Philadelphia, Pennsylvania
Mary, m. 1769 Gunning Bedford, Sr.

References

Read
Read